Interactions LLC is a privately held  technology company that builds and delivers hosted Virtual Assistant applications that enable businesses to deliver automated natural language communications for enterprise customer care.

History
Interactions LLC was founded in 2004 and is headquartered in Franklin, Massachusetts. Since inception, Interactions has raised $167M and is venture-backed by Sigma Partners, Cross Atlantic Capital Partners, Updata Partners, North Hill Ventures, Revolution Growth, NewSpring Capital, and Comcast Ventures. Michael Iacobucci serves as Interactions' CEO.  Interactions has additional offices in Indiana, Michigan, New Jersey and New York.

In 2010, Interactions received PCI DSS compliance validation.

In April 2012, Interactions was named a 2012 Gartner 'Cool Vendor' in CRM Customer Service and Social.

In November 2014, Interactions announced the acquisition of AT&T's Speech and Language Technology group, along with its AT&T Watson(SM) platform.

In June 2016 the company announced a new service named Curo Speech and Language Platform, based on the acquired AT&T technology, to provide enhanced natural language understanding within its products. Later in 2016 the company updated its Virtual Assistant offering to include a voice biometric add-on, which helps prevent fraud in automated Virtual Assistant interactions.

In May 2017, Interactions acquired AI-based social media engagement innovator Digital Roots. Interactions Digital Roots uses social AI, natural language processing and machine learning to help global household brands engage with consumers on social media. In September 2017, Interactions was named to the Forbes Next Billion-Dollar Startups list.

Services
Operating under a SaaS business model, Interactions' service includes both an application's design and build, as well as continuous operating and tuning.

Customers
Interactions' customer base includes consumer-facing companies, including Hyatt, TXU Energy, The Salt River Project, Westar Energy, and LifeLock. Interactions customers represent the Telecommunication, Hospitality, Finance, Insurance and Warranty, Retail, Utility, Consumer Software and Electronics, and Healthcare industries.

References 

Telephone services
Speech recognition
Applications of artificial intelligence
User interface techniques